The following is a list of squads for each national team competing at the 2019 AFC U-19 Women's Championship. The tournament took place in Thailand, between 27 October–9 November 2019. It was the 10th U-19 age group competition organised by the Asian Football Confederation.

Players born between 1 January 2000 and 31 December 2004 are eligible to compete in the tournament. Each team had to register a squad of minimum 16 players and maximum 23 players, minimum two of whom must have been goalkeepers (Regulations Articles 24.1 and 24.2). The full squad listings are below.

Group A

Thailand 
Coach: Arun Tulwattanangkul

The final squad was named on 15 October 2019.

North Korea 
Coach: Song Sung-gwon

Australia 
Coach: Leah Blayney 

The final squad was named on 15 October 2019.

Vietnam 
Coach:  Akira Ijiri

The preliminary squad was named on 6 October 2019. The final squad was announced on 21 October 2019.

Group B

Japan 
Coach: Futoshi Ikeda

The final squad was named on 3 October 2019.

China PR 
Coach:  Park Tae-ha

The final squad was announced on 27 October 2019.

South Korea 
Coach: Hur Jung-jae

The final squad was announced on 27 October 2019.

Myanmar 
Coach: Thet Thet Win

The final squad was announced on 22 October 2019.

References

2019 AFC U-19 Women's Championship